Chuan Sha is a Chinese-born Canadian poet and author. He has written novels, short stories, poems, plays, essays and literary reviews.

Biography 
Chuan Sha was born in Chongqing in Sichuan Province, though he has ancestry in Shandong Province. After graduating from Sichuan University, he worked as editor-in-chief for a literary magazine for some years before pursuing further studies in the United Kingdom in 1991. He has lived since 1999 with his family in Toronto.

He has been editor-in-chief for two Canada publishing houses and for a number of local newspapers. He is now the Director of the Chinese-Canadian Poets Association, Dean of Daya Institute of Cultures of Canada, Co-Chair of the Daya Literary Prize Committee, and CEO of the Daya Academic Evaluation and Judgment Committee. In addition, he is a member of the Chinese PEN Society of Canada.

Works

Prose
The Lady in the Blue-Flowered Mandarin Gown 蓝花旗袍 (Huashan Literature and Art Publishing House, China, June 2012)  - novel
The Sunlight (Taiwan Commercial Press, Ltd., November 2004) - novel
The Sojourners (Taiwan Buffalo Publishing House, May 2004) - short stories, co-authored

Poetry
Appreciation: Selected Poems of Chuan Sha 川沙诗歌精品欣赏 (Hebei Education Press, China, June 2010) 
"The Wolves are Roaring", translated by Liu Hong, in Language for a New Century: Contemporary Poetry from the Middle East, Asia, and Beyond, edited by Tina Chang, Nathalie Handal, Ravi Shankar (W. W. Norton & Company, U.S.A., 2008)
Spring Night 春夜集 (Guangxi Normal University Press, February 2006) 
contribution to Variety Crossing Vol. 8 (Korean-Canadian Literary Forum, 21 Press, 2006)
The Shadowy Crowds (China's Writers Printing House, November 2001)

Performances
Harmony. Original poetry edited in 6-Act Choir. Public performances given in the P.C. Ho Theatre on November 1, 2008.
The Skirts Are Singing. Original Poetry edited in 4-Act Musical. Public performances in O.I.S.E. Theatre, University of Toronto, and in York Woods Public Library Theatre, 2005.

See also 
List of Canadian poets

References

External links 
Author's blog
Some of his works (in English-Chinese bilingual form)

Living people
Writers from Chongqing
People's Republic of China poets
Canadian male journalists
Canadian male non-fiction writers
Chinese emigrants to Canada
Poets from Chongqing
Canadian male poets
Canadian male novelists
1952 births